Theodore R. Alexander (September 15, 1912 – March 6, 1999) was an American baseball pitcher in the Negro leagues.

Biography
Alexander was born in Spartanburg, South Carolina. He played with several teams from 1938 to 1949, playing mostly with the Kansas City Monarchs.

He died on March 6, 1999, in East Orange, New Jersey at the age of 86.

References

External links
 and Baseball-Reference Black Baseball Stats and  Seamheads

1912 births
1999 deaths
African-American baseball players
Baseball players from South Carolina
Birmingham Black Barons players
Chicago American Giants players
Cleveland Bears players
Homestead Grays players
Indianapolis ABCs (1938) players
Kansas City Monarchs players
London Majors players
New York Black Yankees players
20th-century African-American sportspeople
Baseball pitchers